is a former Japanese football player.

Playing career
Shima was born in Tokushima Prefecture on 3 October 1967. After graduating from high school, he joined Japan Soccer League club Mazda (later Sanfrecce Hiroshima) in 1986. He played many matches as forward and the club won the 2nd place 1987 Emperor's Cup. In 1992, Japan Soccer League was folded and founded new league J1 League. The club won the 2nd place 1994 J1 League. However he could not play at all in the match for injury in 1995 and retired end of 1995 season.

Club statistics

References

External links

biglobe.ne.jp

1967 births
Living people
Association football people from Hiroshima Prefecture
Japanese footballers
Japan Soccer League players
J1 League players
Sanfrecce Hiroshima players
Association football forwards